Kim Hyeon-tae (born 1990) is a South Korean alpine ski racer.

He competed at the 2015 World Championships in Beaver Creek, USA, in the giant slalom.

References

1990 births
South Korean male alpine skiers
Living people
Asian Games medalists in alpine skiing
Alpine skiers at the 2017 Asian Winter Games
Asian Games silver medalists for South Korea
Medalists at the 2017 Asian Winter Games
21st-century South Korean people